Tovarishch (Това́рищ , The Comrade) was a bourgeois daily paper published in St. Petersburg, Russia, from March 1906 to January 1908. It was not the official organ of any particular party, but functioned as the mouthpiece of the Left Cadets. Mensheviks also contributed to this paper.

References

Newspapers published in the Russian Empire
Mass media in Saint Petersburg